Criminal Conversation is a novel published in 1994 by Evan Hunter, set in Brooklyn, New York.

Plot 
Sarah Welles, 34, a private school English teacher, is happily married to Assistant District Attorney Michael Welles, Organized Crime, Manhattan. Michael Welles is chasing suspected Mafia-connected businessman Andrew Faviola, 28, son of jailed don Anthony and himself pushing to establish a new territory by the creation of "moon rock", a brand of cocaine and opium with far-reaching interests.

Sarah meets Andrew Faviola while she is on holiday in the Caribbean. Little does she know that after he saves her pre-teen daughter from drowning, he will come after her next—or that their trysts at his apartment are being taped by Michael (her husband) in an effort to gain criminal evidence of Andrew's mafia activities. When Michael realises that the "unknown blonde" is his wife, their marriage and relationship is under threat.

References

1994 American novels
Legal thriller novels
Novels set in Brooklyn
Novels about organized crime in the United States
Novels by Evan Hunter
Novels set in New York (state)
American thriller novels